Faggin is an Italian surname. Notable people with the surname include:

Federico Faggin (born 1941), Italian-American physicist and inventor
Faggin Passeggiata, Italian owner of Faggin Bicycles
Leandro Faggin (1933–1970), Italian cyclist

See also
Faggin-Nazzi alphabet

Italian-language surnames